Relay Peak is a 10,338-foot-elevation mountain summit located in Washoe County, Nevada, United States.

Description
Relay Peak is set five miles north of Lake Tahoe in the Mount Rose Wilderness, on land managed by the Humboldt-Toiyabe National Forest. It is part of the Carson Range which is a subset of the Sierra Nevada. The Tahoe Rim Trail traverses the summit of the peak, providing an approach option, and the summit represents the highest point anywhere along the entire 170 mile trail. This landform's toponym was officially adopted in 1990 by the U.S. Board on Geographic Names.

Climate

According to the Köppen climate classification system, Relay Peak is located in an alpine climate zone. Most weather fronts originate in the Pacific Ocean, and travel east toward the Sierra Nevada mountains. As fronts approach, they are forced upward by the peaks (orographic lift), causing them to drop their moisture in the form of rain or snowfall onto the range.

See also
 List of Lake Tahoe peaks

References

External links
 Weather forecast: Relay Peak

Mountains of Washoe County, Nevada
Mountains of Nevada
Humboldt–Toiyabe National Forest
North American 3000 m summits
Mountains of the Sierra Nevada (United States)